Doumea stilicauda is a species of catfish in the genus Doumea. It lives in the So'o River, a tributary of the Nyong River, in Cameroon. Its length reaches 17.5 cm.

References 

Amphiliidae
Freshwater fish of Africa
Fish described in 2010